Pavlovka is a rural locality (a selo) and the administrative center of Pavlovsky Selsoviet, Uglovsky District, Altai Krai, Russia. The population was 1,000 as of 2013. It was founded in 1907. There are 13 streets.

Geography 
Pavlovka is located 33 km west of Uglovskoye (the district's administrative centre) by road. Bor-Kosobulat is the nearest rural locality.

References 

Rural localities in Uglovsky District, Altai Krai